Peppi & Kokki were a Laurel & Hardy-style comedy duo from the Netherlands; they had their own television series in the 1970s. Gerard van Essen (1924–1997) played fat Peppi, Herman Kortekaas (1930) played lean Kokki.

History

Early years
Gerard van Essen began his career in the 1940s at the circus with his brother Jacques as the Kame Brothers; he adopted the stagename John. When Jacques quit in 1957, he found a replacement in stalwart Herman Kortekaas.

Throughout the 1960s, they performed as clowns Pipo & Kiko and made their television debut in 1971. There was one small problem; there was already a televised clown called Pipo (Pipo de Clown); thus, the duo changed their names to Peppi & Kokki.

Television series
In 1972, Peppi & Kokki started working on a slapstick series for broadcast on KRO children's television; they portrayed two sailors forced to take odd jobs because their inherited ship (Alma) ceased to function.

The intro-footage, reshot by 1974, sees the pair waking up, having breakfast and fooling around rather than going to work.

Peppi & Kokki wore vintage blue suits, white hats and Charlie Chaplin-style shoes, although Peppi would later switch over to sneakers.

The voices were muted out in favour of a ragtime piano and narration. Later episodes ended with a song recapturing the event.

Peppi & Kokki; the movie
In 1976 a spoken movie was taped; Peppi & Kokki bij de Marine begins with a trip to the beach (one of the series' recurring subjects) where a bomb is discovered. Peppi & Kokki end up on a ship solving the mystery of a captain who receives death-threats which actually serve to prepare him for his 50th birthday. The movie was later serialised in the same manner as the regular episodes.

The end and next
The duo split in 1979 because Kortekaas had contracted a hernia. Van Essen unsuccessfully continued with a replacement before touring as a solo-artist on the (children's) party-circuit.

Van Essen celebrated his 50th career-anniversary in 1992, the same year that Peppi & Kokki were introduced to a new generation; he died on January 2, 1997, during a holiday in Thailand, shortly after learning about the Peppi & Kokki-theme-tune getting a happy hardcore-make-over (Gabber Piet's Hakke & Zage).

Meanwhile, Kortekaas returned to children's entertainment but also appeared in a variety of movies and television series, notably Zeg 'ns Aaa in which he played the brother-in-law of Carry Tefsen who once guested in Peppi & Kokki. Between 1995 and 2005 he played a bartender in the successful crime-series Baantjer.

Merchandise
Some episodes were available on video in the mid-1980s. In 2004 a three-part DVD was released in celebration of their 30th anniversary.

Michael Jackson
On June 1, 1977, Peppi & Kokki were interviewed by talkshow-host Sonja Barend; backstage they met Michael Jackson who noted their similarities to Laurel & Hardy and triggered off a conversation about the comedians from the silent era. A 5-year-old fan of Peppi & Kokki joined in and had his picture taken with them.

Sources

Dutch comedy duos
Television duos
Fictional sailors
Fictional Dutch people
Comedy television characters
Male characters in television
1972 Dutch television series debuts
1979 Dutch television series endings
Dutch children's television series
Television characters introduced in 1972
Television shows adapted into films